Gabriele Dallapiccola (born  in Trento) is an Italian wheelchair curler.

He participated in the 2010 Winter Paralympics where Italian team finished on fifth place.

Teams

References

External links 

Player profile - FISG - Federazione Italiana Sport del Ghiaccio (Italian Ice Sports Federation)
Profile at the Official Website for the 2010 Winter Paralympics in Vancouver
Gabriele Dallapiccola | Sky Sport

Living people
1976 births
Sportspeople from Trento
Italian male curlers
Italian wheelchair curlers
Paralympic wheelchair curlers of Italy
Wheelchair curlers at the 2010 Winter Paralympics